Old Buckenham Fen is a  biological Site of Special Scientific Interest south of Attleborough in Norfolk.

This valley fen has cattle grazed wet meadows, species rich reedbeds, a mere and dykes. Flora in wetter areas include ragged robin, marsh thistle and ladies smock.

Most of the site is private land but there is a public footpath in the south-west corner.

References

Sites of Special Scientific Interest in Norfolk